Thriller is a 2018 American slasher film directed by Dallas Jackson in his directorial debut. The film was written by Jackson and Ken Rance. It stars Jessica Allain, Tequan Richmond, Chelsea Rendon, Mitchell Edwards, Pepi Sonuga, Maestro Harrell, RZA and Mykelti Williamson. The film is a co-production between Divide/Conquer and Blumhouse Productions.

The film premiered at the LA Film Festival on September 23, 2018 and was released by Netflix on April 14, 2019.

Plot 
Years after a childhood prank goes horribly wrong, a clique of South Central LA teens find themselves terrorized during Homecoming weekend by a killer hell-bent on revenge.

Cast 
 Jessica Allain as Lisa Walker
 Luke Tennie as Derrick Jackson
 Tequan Richmond as Andre Dixon
 Paige Hurd as Gina Brown
 Mykelti Williamson as Detective Raymond Johnson
 RZA as Principal Hurd 
 Jason Woods as Chauncey Page
 Michael Ocampo as Eddie Gomez
 Vanessa Bell Calloway as Mrs. Jackson
 Maestro Harrell as Ronnie DeBerry
 Big Boy as himself
 Pepi Sonuga as Kim Morris
 Vanessa A. Williams as Mrs. Walker
 Chelsea Rendon as Tiffany Rodriguez 
 Valery Ortiz as Ms. Cruz
 The Lady of Rage as Emma Page
 Mitchell Edwards as Ty Reynolds

Production
Principal photography on the film began in June 2017. Post production for the film was completed in May 2018.

Reception
The website's critical consensus reads, "Thriller has an appealing cast and a fresh perspective on its genre, but those elements aren't enough to outweigh a bland and predictable story."

See also
List of black films of the 2010s

References

External links 
 

2018 films
2018 horror thriller films
2010s psychological horror films
2010s slasher films
2010s teen horror films
African-American horror films
American horror drama films
American horror thriller films
American psychological horror films
American psychological thriller films
American slasher films
Blumhouse Productions films
Films scored by RZA
Films set in Los Angeles
2010s English-language films
2010s American films